Cheburashka, also known as Topple in earlier English translations, is a fictional character created by Soviet writer Eduard Uspensky in his 1965 children's book Gena the Crocodile and His Friends. The character subsequently appeared as the protagonist in a series of stop-motion animated films by Roman Kachanov (Soyuzmultfilm studio), the first of which was made in 1969, with songs composed by Vladimir Shainsky.

Story
Cheburashka is an iconic Russian classic cartoon character who later became a popular character in Russian jokes (along with his friend, Gena the Crocodile).  According to the creator of the character, Eduard Uspensky, Cheburashka is an "animal unknown to science", with large monkey-like ears and a body resembling that of a cub, who lives in a tropical forest. He accidentally gets into a crate of oranges, eats his fill, and falls asleep. The crate is eventually delivered to a grocery store in an unnamed Russian city (hinted to be Moscow), where the rest of the main story unfolds.

The puzzled store manager finds the creature in the crate when he opens it, and takes him out and sits him on the table. The creature's paws are numb after staying in the crate for so long, and he tumbles down (a Russian colloquialism meaning "tumbled") from the table, onto the chair, and then onto the floor. This inspires the store manager to name him Cheburashka. Words with this root were archaic in Russian; Uspensky gave them a new lease on life. (The Explanatory Dictionary of the Live Great Russian language of Vladimir Dahl gives the meaning of "cheburashka" as another name for the roly-poly toy.)

Animated series
 1. Gena the Crocodile (1969)
 2. Cheburashka (1971)
 3. Shapoklyak (1974)
 4. Cheburashka Goes to School (1983)
 Cheburashka Arere? (GoHands, Japan, 2009)

Live-action film
 Cheburashka (Russia, 2023)

Characters

Cheburashka and friends
Cheburashka is male, has a bear-like body, and is about the size of a 5-year-old child. He is a toddling creature with huge round ears on the side of his head that droop when he is discouraged. He has feet without legs, big black eyes, a snub nose. His voice is high-pitched and childlike. Cheburashka is an optimist as he only sees the best in people and is chirpy even in the gloomiest situation. Sergei Kapkov, animation historian and managing editor of Soyuzmultfilm, has said that Cheburashka "is absolutely useless and hopeless. He is like a stranger who doesn't understand a thing but just has one global idea, and that is to make friends and have others ... make friends with each other." 

After being turned down by the zoo as an "animal unknown to science," Cheburashka gets hired as a window display for a discount store selling factory seconds because he resembles one, residing in a phone booth. In the tale, he befriends an anthropomorphic crocodile named Gena, who wears a hat, a bow tie, and a coat, and plays the accordion. Gena works in a zoo as a zoo animal. Gena's favorite songs are "Such a Pity that One's Birthday Happens Only Once a Year" and "The Blue Train Car", both of which are extremely popular with children.

Antagonist
Cheburashka and Gena have their adventures made more difficult by a character named "Старуха Шапокляк" (Old Lady Shapoklyak). She is a mischievous but charming old lady. Shapoklyak is tall and thin, wears a hat, a dark-coloured dress, and bloomers, and carries around a pet rat, Lariska, in her purse to help her play pranks on people, though near the end of some stories she turns around and helps the protagonists. The chorus of her theme song contains her motto, "One won't ever get famous for good deeds."

Copyright issues

The rights to the Cheburashka character and image have been heavily debated in court. In 1994, Eduard Uspensky (the writer) copyrighted the character's name and image and proceeded to sell the rights to various countries. Leonid Shvartsman, the art director of the animated films, has tried to prove in court that he was the creator of Cheburashka's visual appearance and that this copyright should be separate from the rights for the literary character. On 13 March 2007, Shvartsman and his lawyer lost a 4.7 million ruble lawsuit against BRK Cosmetics and Eduard Uspensky. Shvartsman alleged that Uspensky sold the rights to the Cheburashka image (which was allegedly not his to sell) to BRK Cosmetics, which used it on packets of toothpaste. The defence argued that the artist who drew the character for the packets had never seen the animated films and, despite the fact that the character on the packets was an exact copy of the one in the animated films, had created the character himself after the impressions left from reading Uspensky's books. Vladimir Entin, defender of Shvartsman's interests, suspected that the jury had to have been bribed in order to hand such an unlikely verdict, but admits that there is no proof.

Cheburashka sightings

Cheburashka is now a staple of Russian cartoons, and there are several licensed products on the market, such as children's joke books and stuffed toys. He is also one of the few Russian animation characters to be the subject of numerous Russian jokes and riddles.

The word "Cheburashka" is also used in a figurative sense to name objects that somehow resemble the creature (such as an An-72 aircraft which, when seen from the front, resembles the character's head) or are just as pleasing as it is (e.g. a colloquial name for a small bottle of lemonadefrom the brand name "Cheburashka").

Cheburashka was also chosen as the official mascot with the main mascots for the Russian Olympic Team in the following games:
 2004 Summer Olympics in Greece
 2006 Winter Olympics in Turin, Italy (with white fur)
 2008 Summer Olympics in Beijing, China (with red fur)
 2010 Winter Olympics in Vancouver, Canada (with blue fur)

Cheburashka also became known in some countries outside the former Soviet Union (and of the Soviet Bloc). He became very popular in Japan after an animated film series about him was shown in 15 cinemas all over Japan and was watched by about 700,000 between summer 2001 and spring 2002. In 2008, the Cheburashka films (as part of the "Ghibli Museum Library") were made available to Japanese cinemas on the same date as Hayao Miyazaki's Ponyo on the Cliff by the Sea.  An English-dubbed edition of at least one of the animated films was released in 1987, titled The Adventures of Charlie and Cubby.

"Drutten och Gena", Sweden 

In the 1970s a series of children's television shows, radio shows, records and magazines were produced in Sweden with the characters Drutten and crocodile Gena. These two characters were based on a couple of Cheburashka and Gena dolls bought on a trip to the Soviet Union, so they were visually identical to Cheburashka and Gena. ("Drutten" means "one who tumbles down", as one meaning of the Swedish colloquial verb "drutta" is "to fall or tumble down".)

But that is where the similarity ends. The two characters sang and told different stories from those in the USSR, lived on a bookshelf rather than in a city and are hand puppets operated in live action rather than stop motion. Only occasionally Swedish public service TV would broadcast a segment of the Russian original, dubbed in Swedish. So, while many Swedes may visually recognize Cheburashka, they will generally not associate these characters with the ones Russian children know.

Collectibles
Cheburashka dolls and other collectibles are produced in Russia, Japan and China. United States National Champion figure skater Johnny Weir is known to be an avid collector of Russian Cheburashka items.

The white and red Olympic mascots were made in three sizes – 14 cm, 18 cm and 27 cm – and wear a sponsor's jersey with the "Bosco Sport" logo on the chest.

T-shirts with Cheburashka are common, including several versions with the character drawn as Alberto Korda's Che Guevara photograph, labeled "Che Burashka".

Tommy Cash, Estonia
Estonian musician Tommy Cash (rapper) has compared himself to the beloved character, stating "I got huge ears, big eyes, call me Cheburashka".

Cheburashka films
Ivan Maximov had said in a 2004 interview that Pilot Studio had been planning to make a Cheburashka feature film and that the scenario had been written out and possibly some footage shot, but that it had been frozen for lack of funds. Cheburashka's popularity in Japan is such that on 4 April 2006, TV Tokyo broadband issued a press announcement that it (in partnership with Frontier Works) has acquired the rights to remake the Cheburashka shorts as a feature film. It is unclear if this was the project that Pilot Studio had been forced to abandon. It was announced that the film, like the original shorts, will be based on puppet animation enhanced with modern stop-motion technology and computer graphics effects (similar to the plans for the Pilot Studio film), and would be shot simultaneously in English and Russian.

In March 2009 it was announced that the new Cheburashka animation would consist of a new animated series, called Cheburashka arere?, which ran for 26 3-minute episodes. Cheburashka arere? premiered on the Nori-Suta 100% television program on 7 October 2009.

The new film, only titled Cheburashka is produced by both Ffango Entertoyment of South Korea and Frontier Works of Japan. Directed by Makoto Nakamura and written by both Mikhail Aldashin and Michiru Shimada. The film opened on 8 December 2010 in Japan. The film's theme song is titled "Orange", performed by Kaela Kimura.

The compilation film of the Japanese remake shorts titled Cheburashka was released in Russia on June 15, 2014.

In September 2021, a full-length film titled Cheburashka was announced with filming beginning in Sochi, and shooting locations also planned in Moscow, Kislovodsk and Pyatigorsk. Dmitry Dyachenko directed, with Central Partnership and Yellow, Black and White producing. The film was released on January 1, 2023. Cheburashka is the highest grossing film in the Russian box office history. Olga Kuzmina voiced Cheburashka, while Sergei Garmash portrayed Gena, a gardener (the film version of Crocodile Gena).

See also

History of Russian animation
List of stop-motion films

References

External links

 Russian fan page
 Japanese official website
 Cheburashka's Room in Poland's Cartoons Museum
 Cheburashka's New Adventures – After stealing hearts at the Turin Winter Olympics, the famed Soviet cartoon character is about to become a movie star in Japan (The Moscow Times. May 12, 2006)
 Cheburator: Cheburashka-themed movie images and artwork
 

Literary characters introduced in 1966
Animated film series
Animated characters
Fictional animals
Films directed by Roman Abelevich Kachanov
Russian culture